Gioacchino Scaduto (1898—1979) was an Italian politician, teacher and jurist.

He was member of the Christian Democracy Party. He has served as Mayor of Palermo from 1952 to 1955.

He was rector of the University of Palermo from 1935 to 1938.

Biography
Gioacchino Scaduto was born in Licata, Italy on 1898 and died in Licata, Italy on 1979. He was a professor of private and civil law at the University of Palermo.

Awards
  Order of Merit of the Italian Republic — 2 June 1955

See also
 List of mayors of Palermo

References

External links
 Gioacchino Scaduto on radioradicale.it

1898 births
1979 deaths
People from Licata
20th-century Italian politicians
Mayors of Palermo
Christian Democracy (Italy) politicians
Heads of universities in Italy
Jurists from Sicily
Academic staff of the University of Palermo